John Joseph Clague PhD FRSC OC (born 1946) is a Canadian authority in Quaternary and environmental earth sciences. He is a professor of earth sciences at Simon Fraser University and an emeritus scientist of the Geological Survey of Canada.

Clague was the editor-in-chief of the Canadian Journal of Earth Sciences, president of the Canadian Geomorphology Research Group and vice president of International Union for Quaternary Research (INQUA).

Clague is an expert in the science of the last 2 million years of earth geological history, and specializes in geological hazards, such as earthquakes, tsunamis, landslides, and floods. He has 35 years experience in surficial/terrain mapping, Quaternary stratigraphic investigations, engineering and environmental interpretations of surficial geological information, and natural hazard studies. He is noted for international research collaboration with other geologists, geographers, biologists, and physicists. He has published 250 papers, reports, and monographs on a wide range of earth science topics of regional and national importance. He has prepared innovative geoscience products for educators and the public, has had numerous television and radio interviews, and has been featured in newspaper and magazine articles.

He has been recognized for his internationally renowned research, his innovative communication of science to the public, and his exceptional service and leadership in geoscience

Education 
In 1967, Clague earned an A.B. magma cum laude from the Occidental College in Los Angeles, California. Two years later he obtained a M.A. in Geology from the University of California in Berkeley, California. In 1973 he defended his thesis and was given a Ph.D. in Geology from the University of British Columbia in Vancouver, B.C.

Career 
From 1973 to 1998, Clague worked for the Geological Survey of Canada in Vancouver studying the evidence and effects of historic disasters. Specializing in the study of major earthquakes in the Pacific Northwest.

Clague spent many years mapping the glacial deposits over a large area of the Fraser drainage basin of central British Columbia. This research allowed him to describe the character and extent of the ice sheet that once covered the area, the pattern and timing of ice growth and decay, and the effects of the ice sheet on the crust of western Canada.

In 1984, he and fellow geologist Prof. G.H. Eisbacher had their book Destructive Mass Movements in High Mountains published.

In 1998, Clague took the position of Professor and Shrum Chair at the Department of Earth Science at Simon Fraser University (SFU). He established an interdisciplinary research program drawing together researchers from different fields together, for example, geologists, biologists, physicists, and physical geographers. His collaborators include scientists at the Geological Survey of Canada, the U.S. Geological Survey, and the British Columbia Geological Survey, and faculty at SFU, University of British Columbia and Carlton University.

In 2003, Clague was appointed Canada Research Chair in Natural Hazards Research at Simon Fraser University.

Work 
Clague's maps and reports have provided information vital to land-use planning, the forestry industry, urban developers, and the siting of highways, pipelines and railroads. With this background, he went on to investigate other natural hazards such as earthquakes and tsunamis.  Clague's concern about potential earthquakes on the west coast led to research on recent subsurface deformation of the Earth's crust, and on geological evidence of past tsunamis.

Correlation of earthquake and tsunami events showed that magnitude 6 to 7 earthquakes have affected southern Vancouver Island about once every 100 years. Not content with this academic success, he became a leading voice in alerting people and governments to the challenges of coping with and planning for future disasters. It is expected that the threat of large magnitude earthquakes will lead to changes in the National Building Code and improvements in emergency preparedness procedures in the Vancouver area.

Clague has vigorously led efforts to make scientific understanding of earthquakes, landslides, and floods more available to the general public, educators and politicians. He has had numerous television and radio interviews (CBC Newsworld, CBC Radio, CTV Television) and has been featured in newspaper and magazine articles (Vancouver Sun, Victoria Times-Colonist, Equinox, Beautiful B.C., Westside News, The Westerly News).  Clague’s research was featured in a 1997 Discovery Channel documentary on earthquakes and tsunamis on the west coast of Canada. 
 
He has also been a leader in the creation of educational materials for students and the general public and has revolutionized the presentation of geoscience to the public with lucid, jargon-free text and visually appealing graphics.

Clague has made presentations to federal politicians on earthquakes and tsunamis as part of a series designed to increase politicians' knowledge of the impact of science in Canada.

Accolades 
2019, appointed as Officer of the Order of Canada by the Governor General of Canada
2007, awarded the Logan Medal by the Geological Association of Canada
2006, awarded the Neale Medal of the Geological Association of Canada
2003, first in the country to obtain a Canada Research Chair in Natural Hazards
2002, awarded the Bancroft Award by the Royal Society of Canada
1999, awarded the C. J. Westerman Memorial Award by the Association of Professional Engineers and Geoscientists of British Columbia
1998, elected to be a Fellow of the Royal Society of Canada
1995, awarded the W. A. Johnston Medal by the Canadian Quaternary Association
1988, awarded the E. B. Burwell Jr. Memorial Award by the Geological Society of America

Select publications 
Clague, J.J. and Evans, S.G. 1998. Natural hazards in the Canadian Cordillera. In Engineering Geology; A Global View from the Pacific Rim. Edited by D.P. Moore and O. Hungr. A.A. Balkema, Rotterdam, Proceedings, 8th International Congress, International Association for Engineering Geology and the Environment, Vancouver, B.C., v. 1, p. 17-44.
Mustard, P.S., Clague, J.J., Woodsworth, G.J., Hickson, C.J., Jackson, L.E., Jr., Luternauer, J.L., Monger, J.W.H., Ricketts, B.D., Turner, R.J.W., Hunter, J.A., and Monahan, P.A. 1998. Geology and geological hazards of the Greater Vancouver area. In Urban Geology of Canadian Cities. Edited by P.F. Karrow and O.L. White. Geological Association of Canada, Special Paper 42, p. 39-70.
Thompson, S.C., Clague, J.J., and Evans, S.G. 1997. Holocene activity of the Mt. Currie scarp, Coast Mountains, British Columbia, and implications for its origin. Environmental and Engineering Geoscience, v. 3, p. 329-348.
Hyndman, R.D., Rogers, G.C., Dragert, H., Wang, K., Clague, J.J., Adams, J., and Bobrowsky, P.T. 1996. Giant earthquakes beneath Canada’s west coast. Geoscience Canada, v. 23, p. 63-72.
Turner, R.J.W., Clague, J.J., and Groulx, B.J. 1996. Geoscape Vancouver—poster. Geological Survey of Canada, Open File 3309, one sheet.
Nelson, A.R., Atwater, B.F., Bobrowsky, P.T., Bradley, L.-A., Clague, J.J., Carver, G.A., Darienzo, M.E., Grant, W.C., Krueger, H.W., Sparks, R., Stafford, T.W., Jr., and Stuiver, M. 1995. Radiocarbon evidence for extensive plate-boundary rupture about 300 years ago at the Cascadia subduction zone. Nature, v. 378, p. 371-374.

References 

 Simon Fraser University Faculty Bio
 Quaternary Geoscience Research Centre
 Science.ca Profile
 Simon Fraser News

External links
 Royal Society of Canada- Bio

1946 births
Living people
American geologists
Canadian geologists
Geological Survey of Canada personnel
Canada Research Chairs
Fellows of the Royal Society of Canada
Occidental College alumni
Officers of the Order of Canada
Academic staff of Simon Fraser University
University of British Columbia Faculty of Science alumni
UC Berkeley College of Letters and Science alumni
Logan Medal recipients